The England women's cricket team toured Australia and New Zealand between December 1968 and March 1969. England played three Test matches against Australia, played for the Women's Ashes. The series was drawn 0–0, meaning that England, as the current holders, retained the Ashes. After their tour of Australia, England toured New Zealand, playing a three Test series which England won 2–0.

Tour of Australia

Squads

Tour Matches

2-day matches

1-day single innings matches

Test Series

1st Test

2nd Test

3rd Test

Tour of New Zealand

Squads

Tour Matches

2-day matches

1-day matches

Test Series

1st Test

2nd Test

3rd Test

References

External links
England Women tour of Australia 1968/69 from Cricinfo
England Women tour of New Zealand 1968/69 from Cricinfo

The Women's Ashes
England women's cricket team tours
Women's international cricket tours of Australia
Women's international cricket tours of New Zealand